Benjamin Ross is a writer and film director, born in 1964, based in the United Kingdom.  His most noted works are The Young Poisoner’s Handbook, based on a real-life poisoning case, Poppy Shakespeare, and  The Frankenstein Chronicles, about a search for a murderer, said to stitch together dead bodies of young children, trying to re-animate them.

Filmography
My Little Eye (1992)
The Young Poisoner’s Handbook (1995)
RKO 281 (1999)
Guilty Hearts (2006) (segment: "Torte Bluma")
Poppy Shakespeare (2008)
The Frankenstein Chronicles (2015) (Season 1)

References

External links 

Living people
British film directors
British screenwriters
Year of birth missing (living people)